The Donald W. Reynolds School of Journalism (RSJ) is a professional school of the University of Nevada, Reno. Established on September 14, 1984, it counts six Pulitzer Prize recipients among its alumni. The school offers programs in advertising, public relations and integrated marketing, visual communications fields such as documentary film and graphic design, and bilingual media fields such as bilingual journalism and bilingual strategic communications.

References

External links
 
 Nevada Media Alliance
 Center for Advanced Media Studies
 Noticiero Móvil
 Reynolds Media Lab

1984 establishments in Nevada
Journalism schools in the United States
University of Nevada, Reno